Yabisi is a genus of tree trunk spiders that was first described by C. A. Rheims & A. D. Brescovit in 2004.  it contains only two species: Y. guaba and Y. habanensis.

References

Araneomorphae genera
Hersiliidae
Spiders of North America